Frank Thomas Hines (April 11, 1879 – April 3, 1960) was a United States military officer and head of the U.S. Veterans Bureau (later Veteran's Administration) from 1923 to 1945. Hines took over as head of the Veterans Bureau after a series of scandals discredited the agency. He was considered a "man of stern honesty." In response to the scandals, the field service was "centralized to establish strict controls and accountability."

Early life
Hines was born in Salt Lake City, Utah Territory, on April 11, 1879.  He graduated from high school in Salt Lake City in 1896, and worked at the mines in Mercur.  He studied engineering at the Utah State Agricultural College for two years before deciding on a military career.

Military career

He joined the Utah Light Artillery in 1898 and served in the United States military during the Spanish–American War, becoming a second lieutenant. He was a captain by World War I, was promoted three times in 1918, and as a brigadier general served as chief of the Embarkation Service with responsibility for transporting more than 2 million soldiers to Europe in 18 months and shipping them home in 8 months.

He retired from the army in 1920 and became president of the Baltic Steamship Company. After leaving active duty, Hines was appointed a brigadier general in the Organized Reserve Corps. He held this rank as an active reservist until reaching the mandatory retirement age of 64 in 1943, when he became a member of the inactive reserve.

Political career
Hines served as the administrator of the Veterans Bureau from his appointment by President Harding in 1923 to 1930, then as the first administrator of its successor, the Veteran's Administration, from 1930 to 1945, when President Truman replaced him with Gen. Omar Bradley.

He opposed the payment of the Veterans Bonus to World War I veterans. On April 26, 1932, during the hearings on Payment of Adjusted-Compensation Certificates before the House Committee on Ways and Means he testified: that the trust fund had already been nearly exhausted by the previous year's act increasing the loan restriction on adjusted compensation accounts to 50%; that full payment now would cost the Government $1,600,000,000; and that in any case the accounts represented the only assets many veterans possessed, leaving nothing to families if the veteran should die. "We should make every possible effort to see that they get employment. There is no question about that. But whether we would be doing the veterans a real service by cashing in these certificates, even if we were in a position to do it, would seem to me very doubtful."

He then served as United States Ambassador to Panama and negotiated an agreement for the United States to lease bases there, where troops had been stationed during the war. The Panama Assembly rejected the agreement by a unanimous vote. Hines resigned in 1947, effective March 1, 1948, to become an executive with Acacia Life Insurance Company.

Personal life and family
Hines was a member of the Church of Jesus Christ of Latter-day Saints (LDS Church).

On October 4, 1900, he married Nellie M. Vier.  They had two children: Viera and Frank.

Death and legacy
Until shortly before his death he served as a director of Acacia Life. Hines died of pneumonia on April 3, 1960, in Mount Alto Veterans Hospital in Washington, D.C. He is buried in Arlington National Cemetery.

Awards and honors
General Hines was a recipient of the Army Distinguished Service Medal as well as the Navy Distinguished Service Medal.

He also received the Spanish War Service Medal and the World War I Victory Medal. His foreign decorations included the Czechoslovak War Cross, British Order of the Bath (Companion), Belgian Order of Leopold II (Grand Officer), French Legion of Honour (Officer), and Japanese Order of the Sacred Treasure (Second Class).

Army Distinguished Service Medal citation

General Orders: War Department, General Orders No. 144 (1918)

Navy Distinguished Service Medal Citation

Authority: The Navy Book of Distinguished Service (Harry Roy Stringer, 1921)

Dates of rank

References

Further reading

External links 

Army Distinguished Service Medal citation for Hines
History of the Veterans Administration
The service of coast artillery by Frank Thomas Hines, Franklin Wilmer Ward
Generals of World War II

|-

|-

1879 births
1960 deaths
Ambassadors of the United States to Panama
Latter Day Saints from Utah
American military personnel of the Spanish–American War
United States Army generals of World War I
Military personnel from Salt Lake City
Recipients of the Distinguished Service Medal (US Army)
Recipients of the Navy Distinguished Service Medal
Recipients of the Czechoslovak War Cross
Knights Companion of the Order of the Bath
Grand Officers of the Order of Leopold II
Officiers of the Légion d'honneur
Recipients of the Order of the Sacred Treasure, 2nd class
United States Department of Veterans Affairs officials
Burials at Arlington National Cemetery
United States Army generals of World War II
United States Army generals